Indian Cave Creek is a tributary of White Oak Run in Lackawanna County, Pennsylvania, in the United States. The creek is not considered to be impaired and it has considerable canopy coverage. A waterfall known as the Forty Foot Falls is located at its mouth.

Course
Indian Cave Creek begins on a mountain in Jefferson Township. It flows northwest for several tenths of a mile and enters Archbald. It then turns south-southwest for a few tenths of a mile, flowing near the border between Archbald and Jefferson Township. The creek then turns west-northwest for a short distance before turning southwest. Several tenths of a mile further downstream, it reaches its confluence with White Oak Run.

Hydrology
Indian Cave Creek is not designated as an impaired waterbody.

Geography and geology

A waterfall known as the Forty Foot Falls is on Indian Cave Creek in Archbald.

Watershed and biology
The mouth of the creek is in the United States Geological Survey quadrangle of Olyphant. However, its source is in the quadrangle of Waymart. The creek also passes through the quadrangle of Carbondale.

Part of or all of the watershed of Indian Cave Creek has a tree canopy coverage of 94 percent. This is one of the highest values for small watersheds in the Scranton Metro Area.

History
Indian Cave Creek was entered into the Geographic Names Information System on August 2, 1979. Its identifier in the Geographic Names Information System is 1199884.

In the early 2000s, the Lackawanna River Watershed Conservation Plan recommended that Jefferson Township include protection of Indian Cave Creek in its zoning plans, comprehensive plans, and other plans. On July 18, 2011, White Stone Quarry, LLC received a permit to discharge stormwater into Indian Cave Creek.

See also
List of rivers of Pennsylvania
List of tributaries of the Lackawanna River

References

External links
Forty Foot Falls

Rivers of Lackawanna County, Pennsylvania
Tributaries of the Lackawanna River
Rivers of Pennsylvania